Deep Space may refer to:

NASA 
 Deep Space Network (disambiguation), international network of satellite ground stations
 Goldstone Deep Space Communications Complex, satellite ground station in California, US
 Madrid Deep Space Communication Complex, satellite ground station in Spain
 Canberra Deep Space Communication Complex, satellite ground station in Australia
 Deep Space 1, spacecraft
 Deep Space 2, two highly advanced miniature probes

Astronomy 
 Empty regions of the universe in outer space
Interstellar space
 Intergalactic space

Other fields 
 Deep Space (film), a 1988 horror sci-fi movie
 Deep Space (music), Saturday late night/early morning radio show on WGPR 107.5 FM in Detroit
 Deep Space (collection), a 1954 collection of short stories by Eric Frank Russell
Deep Space (EP), an EP by Eisley
 Deep Space, a video game company and subsidiary of Sony Computer Entertainment
 Deep Space Industries, an American company developing and producing spacecraft technology
 "Deep Space", a song by Blank Banshee from the album Blank Banshee 0
 "Deep Space", a song by Sub Focus from the album Sub Focus

See also
 Deep space exploration
 deepspace, a German-Australian ambient music artist